Linn County Jail and Sheriff's Residence is a historic jail and sheriff's residence located in Linneus, Linn County, Missouri.  It was built in 1871 and is a two-story, five bay, Greek Revival style I-house constructed of concrete, wood, and brick. A one-story brick addition with basement, built as a Works Progress Administration project, was added in 1937. The building was converted to a museum in the 1970s.

It was added to the National Register of Historic Places in 2001.

References

History museums in Missouri
Works Progress Administration in Missouri
Government buildings on the National Register of Historic Places in Missouri
Greek Revival architecture in Missouri
Government buildings completed in 1871
Museums in Linn County, Missouri
National Register of Historic Places in Linn County, Missouri